Le Castellet is a commune in the Var department of the Provence-Alpes-Côte d'Azur region in Southeastern France. It consists of a small feudal village perched on a cliff edge and its surroundings. It is situated north-west of Toulon next to La Cadière-d'Azur and Le Beausset. It is surrounded by vineyards and is part of the Côtes de Provence Appellation d'origine contrôlée (AOC) of Bandol. The Circuit Paul Ricard is also located in the commune.

Geography

Climate

Le Castellet has a hot-summer Mediterranean climate (Köppen climate classification Csa).

Cinema
Le Castellet was the setting for the film The Baker's Wife (French: La femme du boulanger), starring Raimu and directed by Marcel Pagnol.

Gallery

See also
Communes of the Var department

References

External links

 Le Castellet tourist office

Castellet